A statue of Queen Victoria stands near Kensington Palace. It was sculpted by Victoria's fourth daughter Princess Louise, Duchess of Argyll and erected in 1893. The statue was made from white marble on a Portland stone base. It depicts Victoria aged 18, seated in her coronation robes, resembling the painting of Victoria at her coronation by Sir George Hayter. The statue received a Grade II listing in 1969.

Victoria was born in Kensington Palace in May 1819, and spent most of her early life there until she ascended to the throne in 1837. The statue was made to celebrate the Golden Jubilee of Queen Victoria in 1887 but took some years to complete. It was commissioned by the Kensington Golden Jubilee Memorial Executive Committee, who sought design proposals. Princess Louise was reluctant to take up a commission to sculpt her mother, but was persuaded to make a model by her friend, the artist Lawrence Alma-Tadema. She submitted her entry anonymously, and it was selected by the judging panel. Princess Louise was herself resident at Kensington Palace, and she sculpted the statue at her studio there (although some press reports suggested it was made by her tutor Sir Joseph Edgar Boehm). The completed sculpture was unveiled by Queen Victoria on 28 June 1893.

The statue suffered bomb damage during the Second World War, with shrapnel removing its nose in 1945. The damaged nose was replaced before the accession of Queen Elizabeth II in 1952, and the nose was replaced a second time for the Golden Jubilee of Elizabeth II in 2002.

A bronze casting of the statue stands in front of the Royal Victoria College, Montreal, now the Strathcona Music Building of McGill University. The replica was commissioned by Donald Smith, 1st Baron Strathcona and Mount Royal, founder of Royal Victoria College, and unveiled in 1900 by Gilbert Elliot-Murray-Kynynmound, 4th Earl of Minto, then Governor General of Canada.

References

 Statue of Queen Victoria, National Heritage List of England, Historic England
 Statue is centre of Kensington Palace's £12m refurbishment, Evening Standard, 4 November 2011
 The Queen reopens Kensington Palace after £12m revamp, BBC News, 15 March 2012
 Queen Victoria: The story of a royal statue, Royal Central, Elizabeth Jane Timms, 16 July 2018
 Queen Victoria Statue, The Royal Parks
 "Princess Louise: The career of a royal artist, part 2", History Scotland, 4 October 2019
 Queen Victoria, 1900, Art Public Montréal

1893 sculptures
Kensington Palace
Grade II listed buildings in the Royal Borough of Kensington and Chelsea
Marble sculptures in the United Kingdom
Monuments and memorials in London
Kensington Palace
Outdoor sculptures in London
Royal monuments in the United Kingdom